USS Kadashan Bay (CVE-76) was a  of the United States Navy. It was named after Kadashan Bay, located within Chichagof Island. The bay in turn was named after Paul K. Kadashan, an Alaskan Indian who established a homestead incorporating the bay in 1915. Launched in December 1943, and commissioned in January 1944, she served in support of the Mariana and Palau Islands campaign, the Battle off Samar, and the Invasion of Lingayen Gulf. Postwar, she participated in Operation Magic Carpet. She was decommissioned in June 1946, when she was mothballed in the Atlantic Reserve Fleet. Ultimately, she was sold for scrapping in February 1960.

Design and description

Kadashan Bay was a Casablanca-class escort carrier, the most numerous type of aircraft carriers ever built, and designed specifically to be mass-produced using prefabricated sections, in order to replace heavy early war losses. She displaced  standard,  with a full load. She was powered with two Unaflow reciprocating steam engines, which drove two shafts, providing , thus enabling her to make . Her compact size necessitated the installment of an aircraft catapult at her bow, and there were two aircraft elevators to facilitate movement of aircraft between the flight and hangar deck: one each fore and aft.

One /38 caliber dual-purpose gun was mounted on the stern. Anti-aircraft defense was provided by eight Bofors  anti-aircraft guns in single mounts, as well as twelve Oerlikon  cannons, which were mounted around the perimeter of the deck. By the end of the war, Casablanca-class carriers had been modified to carry thirty  cannons, and the amount of Bofors  guns had been doubled to sixteen, by putting them into twin mounts. These modifications were in response to increasing casualties due to kamikaze attacks. Casablanca-class escort carriers were designed to carry 27 aircraft, but the hangar deck could accommodate more. During the Mariana and Palau Islands campaign, she carried 16 FM-2 fighters, and 11 TBM-1C torpedo bombers, for a total of 27 aircraft. However, during the Battle off Samar, she carried 24 FM-2 fighters and 9 TBM-1C torpedo bombers for a total of 33 aircraft. During the Invasion of Lingayen Gulf, she carried 22 FM-2 fighters, 11 TBM-1C torpedo bombers, and a TBM-1CP reconnaissance plane.

Construction
The escort carrier was laid down on 2 September 1943, under a Maritime Commission contract, MC hull 1113, by Kaiser Shipbuilding Company, Vancouver, Washington. She was named Kadashan Bay, as part of a tradition which named escort carriers after bays or sounds in Alaska. She was launched on 11 December 1943; sponsored by Miss Audrey Ackerman; transferred to the United States Navy and commissioned on 18 January 1944, with Captain Robert Nisbet Hunter in command.

Service history
Upon being commissioned, Kadashan Bay underwent a shakedown cruise off of San Diego. On 6 March, she departed San Diego on a cruise to Espiritu Santo. She made two runs, transporting 154 aircraft, before returning to San Diego on 13 May. Following a brief period of repairs and training, the escort carrier sailed on 10 July to join a Task Group 32.7 at Pearl Harbor. This task group was formed in preparation for the imminent Mariana and Palau Islands campaign. In August, she sailed for Tulagi, where final preparations were made for the imminent invasion.

Her task group departed Tulagi on 6 September, arriving off of Peleliu on 11 September. There, the escort carriers launched airstrikes to destroy defenses and to prepare the way for landings, although the impact by these bombings proved to be insufficient. The marines landed on 15 September, seizing the air field, and finding themselves in a battle of attrition against a determined Japanese garrison. Kadashan Bay stayed offshore the island, providing close air support until the beginning of October, when she retired to Manus to restock on supplies. After a short period of rest, she steamed towards Leyte Gulf on 14 October, providing cover for Task Group 78.6, a reinforcement group which would stay offshore of Leyte.

Upon arriving on 21 October and joining Taffy 2, she began conducting airstrikes in support of troops which had already landed. On 25 October, one of her fighters, piloted by Ensign Hans L. Jensen, on a routine patrol mission, sighted the Central Force of the Japanese fleet off of Samar. After reporting his sighting, he launched an unsupported attack against the leading cruiser, beginning the decisive Battle off Samar. Once learning of the size and the importance of the Japanese fleet, she launched three fighter and three torpedo strikes against the Japanese force, which was threatening Taffy 3. The large number of American planes was a contributing force in convincing Vice admiral Takeo Kurita to retire, and to not take advantage of his position. On 30 October, she retired for Manus, where she arrived on 3 November.

In late November, the escort carriers began departing Manus and congregating at Kossol Roads, and on 10 December, she sortied for Mindoro. From 12 to 13 December, she transited the Surigao Strait, and as she moved west, her task group came under heavy aerial attack. In these actions, her fighters accounted for eleven planes, with running battles continuing to the end of December. By now, preparations were underway for the Invasion of Lingayen Gulf. As part of Vice Admiral Daniel E. Barbey's San Fabian task group, she provided air cover for the ships as they proceeded behind the main force. Eventually, she rendezvoused with the main force covering the landings on 3 January 1945.

Kadashan Bay arrived off of Luzon on 8 January, where she prepared to commence operations. At 7:00 that morning, she, along with Marcus Island, launched two squadrons of fighters. At 7:16, radar detected a large contingent of Japanese aircraft,  to the east of the task group, which separated into three groups. The fighters moved to intercept, with other escort carriers contributing their own fighters. At 7:46, Kadashan Bay finished launching her last four fighters, and as they struggled for altitude, a Nakajima Ki-43 kamikaze aircraft dove towards the carrier. Whilst the newly launched fighters were helpless against the first kamikaze, they did manage to shoot down a different kamikaze, a Kawasaki Ki-61 fighter which attempted to follow up on Kadashan Bay.

The Nakajima Ki-43 that the fighter crews had spotted were also noticed by the crew of Kadashan Bay. The crew observed the plane break away from an engagement several miles east, and head straight towards the carrier. Consequently, the ship's crew started a hard left turn in an attempt to stall for time. Although the aircraft came under heavy anti-aircraft fire, it continued, aiming directly for the carrier's bridge. The kamikaze sparked a brief gasoline fire, which was quickly put under control. A more pressing concern was flooding, which was accentuated by the ship's turn. Remarkably, no-one was killed, and only three crewmen were wounded by the kamikaze. Nonetheless, the damage forced Kadashan Bay to retire from operations. On 10 January, she transferred her aircraft contingent to Marcus Island, and she returned to Leyte on 12 January for temporary repairs.

On 13 February, she arrived at San Diego for further repairs, and then reported at San Francisco for complete overhaul. Once overhaul was finished, she sailed for Pearl Harbor on 8 April, where she arrived on 14 April. She would spend the rest of the war ferrying aircraft and men throughout the Pacific. During July the escort carrier was designated as a replenishment carrier for the Third Fleet. She was en route from Pearl Harbor to begin her new duty when the news of Japan's surrender was received.

Post-war
After the end of the war, Kadashan Bay joined Operation Magic Carpet, which repatriated U.S. servicemen from throughout the Pacific. She reported at Guam in September and arrived at San Francisco on 26 September with her first group of veterans. For the next three months, the escort carrier conducted Magic Carpet runs, stopping at Pearl Harbor, Guam, Okinawa, and China. She arrived at San Pedro on 22 December to finish her last Pacific cruise, and departed San Diego on 10 January 1946, bound for Boston. Kadashan Bay arrived at Boston on 29 January, was decommissioned on 14 June 1946, and subsequently placed in the Atlantic Reserve Fleet there. She was reclassified CVU-76 on 12 June 1955. She was redesignated as an aircraft ferry on 7 May 1959, and given the hull symbol AKV-26. She was struck from the Navy list on 1 August 1959 and sold for scrap to Comarket Inc. in February 1960. She was broken up in Hong Kong, starting June 1960.

References

Sources

Online sources

Bibliography

External links 

 

 

Casablanca-class escort carriers
World War II escort aircraft carriers of the United States
Ships built in Vancouver, Washington
1944 ships
S4-S2-BB3 ships